Jean Mollien (1903 – 14 February 1952) was a Swiss bobsledder. He competed in the five-man event at the 1928 Winter Olympics.

References

1903 births
1952 deaths
Swiss male bobsledders
Olympic bobsledders of Switzerland
Bobsledders at the 1928 Winter Olympics
Place of birth missing